Þórunn Helga Jónsdóttir (born 17 December 1984) is an Icelandic footballer who currently plays for KR as a defensive midfielder. Þórunn Helga is part of Iceland's national team and has played professional football in Brazil.

Club career
In 2004 Þórunn Helga played varsity soccer for Rhode Island Rams and was named Atlantic 10 Rookie of the Year.

Following her return to KR, Þórunn Helga signed for Brazilian club Santos in October 2008. There she found success in the Copa Libertadores Femenina in both 2009 and 2010.

After a year with Flamengo in 2011 and Vitória in 2012, Þórunn Helga agreed to sign with Norway's Avaldsnes for the 2013 season.

International career
Þórunn Helga was called into the senior Iceland squad for the first time in July 2009, for friendlies against England and Denmark. She was not selected for UEFA Women's Euro 2009, but four years later, national team coach Siggi Eyjólfsson included her in the Iceland squad for UEFA Women's Euro 2013.

References

External links

1984 births
Living people
Thorunn Helga Jonsdottir
Thorunn Helga Jonsdottir
Expatriate women's footballers in Norway
Thorunn Helga Jonsdottir
Thorunn Helga Jonsdottir
Toppserien players
Expatriate women's footballers in Brazil
Expatriate women's soccer players in the United States
Thorunn Helga Jonsdottir
Santos FC (women) players
Avaldsnes IL players
Women's association football midfielders
Rhode Island Rams women's soccer players
Icelandic expatriate sportspeople in the United States
Clube de Regatas do Flamengo (women) players
Associação Acadêmica e Desportiva Vitória das Tabocas players
Icelandic expatriate sportspeople in Brazil